The 2003 Abia State gubernatorial election occurred on April 19, 2003. Incumbent Governor, PDP's Orji Uzor Kalu won election for a second term, defeating his former deputy, ANPP's Eyinnaya Abaribe, and two other candidates.

Orji Uzor Kalu won the PDP nomination at the primary election. His running mate was Chima Nwafor.

Electoral system
The Governor of Abia State is elected using the plurality voting system.

Results
A total of four candidates registered with the Independent National Electoral Commission to contest in the election. PDP candidate Orji Uzor Kalu won election for a second term, defeating three other candidates.

The total number of registered voters in the state was 1,285,428. However, only 64.05% (i.e. 823,347) of registered voters participated in the exercise.

References 

Abia State gubernatorial elections
Abia State gubernatorial election
Abia State gubernatorial election